Hopin Academy is a non-profit educational organization located in Tamale, Northern Region, Ghana, that is open to anyone 24 hours a day. Hopin Academy provides pragmatic and innovative approaches towards exploring the various fields of entrepreneurship with the aid of technology, thus beating the competition in labour market. It derived its name from its educational philosophy as a school designed for students to "hop in and hop out," rather than having strictly organized timetable structures. The school specializes on training online marketing, social media communication, writing, video production, entrepreneurial work and web communications.  Hopin Academy has established an international academic partnership with Bryn Mawr College and Haverford College through the BiCo-Dalun Summer Action Research Fellowship, a learning program fostered in 2010 where Bryn Mawr and Haverford students create community projects with Ghanaian partners. According to the Hopin Academy website, they offer courses in writing, design, film, and entrepreneurial work. They also provide training to NGOs, government organizations, and other schools, such as the Olive School of Journalism and they as well provide entrepreneurial support to start up business from idea stages through to implementations and also provide financial support to many startups. Entrepreneurs are resourced with the best content available on internet platforms and in apps and are also trained to develop key competencies in the realizations of their goals.

History
Hopin Academy was started in 2010 as a social enterprise that aims to serve as an alternative to the Ghanaian public education system.  The educational initiative was co-founded by a Ghanaian entrepreneur,  MacCarthy M. Mac-Gbathy and the Danish film maker and Harvard-trained "innovator," Anders Midtgaard.

Collaborations
The academy partners with over 20 renowned corporate institutions and has successfully natured over 40 startups and also seen over a hundred community events effectively carried out since its inception in 2013.  In addition to offering courses and technological resources, Hopin Academy supports Barcamp Tamale, which is a networking forum hosted in Tamale that connects Ghanaian leaders and innovators with young people. Hopin Academy also supports the Youth Speak Up Project, which is a Ghanaian advocacy program that aims to empower youth through technology education. Hopin Academy has collaborated with other educational institutions in the international community, including:
 YEfL-Ghana
 Olive School of Journalism
 Tamale Polytechnic
 University for Development Studies
 Bryn Mawr College
 Haverford College
Viborg Gymnasium
 Ghana Friendship Groups
 Copenhagen Business Academy
NORSAAC

Projects and operation
Apart from the entrepreneurial training and business incubation, the center also runs its own business startups in areas such as transportation, agriculture and recycling. They include Agri Transportas, M&M Xpress and Right Shea.

Most recent activity was the Social Media Week (SMW) in December 2019, with various sessions in skills development such as E-Waste up-cycling and monetizing YouTube as well as engagement with some NGOs and traditional authorities.

References

External links

Schools in Ghana
Education companies of Ghana
2010 establishments in Ghana
Northern Region (Ghana)